Geoff T. Chilvers (31 January 1925 – 1971) was a professional footballer who made 118 appearances in the Football League for Crystal Palace as a wing-half. He also played non-league football for Sutton United and for Gravesend & Northfleet.

Playing career
Chilvers began his career at Sutton United and signed for Crystal Palace in 1942. He made his senior debut in a wartime, London League, 10–1 home win against Brighton on 3 January 1942. However, that was his only appearance that season and he did not make a further appearance until March 1946, with a single game in the wartime Division Three South (South Region).

Chilvers did not make his Football League debut until 2 October 1948 in a 1–3 home defeat to Walsall and went on to make 17 league appearances that season, scoring once.

Over the subsequent five seasons, Chilvers made 15, 30, 22, 28 and 6 appearances respectively, without scoring before moving on to Gravesend & Northfleet in 1954. He made a total of 123 senior appearances for Palace including five in the FA Cup but excluding his wartime appearances.

Personal life
Geoff Chilvers died in 1971 aged 45 or 46.

References

External links 

Geoff Chilvers at holmesdale.net

1925 births
1971 deaths
Footballers from Sutton, London
English Football League players
Sutton United F.C. players
Crystal Palace F.C. players
Ebbsfleet United F.C. players
Association football midfielders
English footballers